Miss Brazil CNB 2019 was the 30th edition of the Miss Brazil CNB pageant and the 5th under CNB Miss Brazil. The contest took place on September 3, 2019. Each state, the Federal District and various Insular Regions & Cities competed for the title. Jéssica Carvalho of Piauí crowned her successor, Elís Miele Coelho of Espírito Santo at the end of the contest. Miele represented Brazil at Miss World 2019. The contest was held at the Dall'Onder Grand Hotel in Bento Gonçalves, Rio Grande do Sul, Brazil.

Results

Regional Queens of Beauty

Special Awards

Challenge Events

Beauty with a Purpose

Cover Girl

Miss Popularity

Miss Social Media

Miss Talent

Delegates
The delegates for Miss Brazil CNB 2019 were:

States

 - Flávia Ferrari
 - Anne Karoline Lisboa
 - Débora Layla
 - Nathaly Félix
 - Isabelle Andrade
 Brasília - Maiza Santa Rita
 - Melissa Lins
 - Elís Miele Coelho
 - Fernanda Bispo
 - Larissa Neiverth
 - Bianca Loyolla
 - Rafaella Felipe
 - Isabella Garcia
 - Larissa Aragão
 - Deise Caroline Ribas
 - Yasmin Fernanda
 - Vanessa Araújo
 - Esthéfane Souza
 - Marcelle Bezerra
 - Jéssica Lírio
 - Flávia Alencar
 - Elizama Aguilar
 - Michelle Valle
 - Marianna Barreto

Insular Regions and Cities

 ABCD Region - Thaís Bonome
 - Nathália Gonçalves
 Araguaia do Pará - Fabrícia Belfort
 - Giovanna Coltro
 - Roberta Mocelin
 - Fernanda Souza
 - Larissa Nehring
 Cerrado Goiano - Júlia Alves
 Costa das Dunas - Larissa Trajano
 Fernando de Noronha - Iully Thaísa
 Greater São Paulo - Sandy Menezes
 Ilha da Pintada - Bruna Maglioli
 Ilha dos Lobos - Ana Flávia Giacomini
 Ilhas do Araguaia - Geicyelly Mendes
 - Thaisi Dias
 Pantanal Matogrossense - Thayná Mello
 São Paulo Capital - Ana Júlia Prado
 - Paula Schirmer

Notes

Did not compete
 (competed as Miss Brasília)

References

External links
 Official site (in Portuguese)

2019
2019 in Brazil
2019 beauty pageants
Beauty pageants in Brazil